Brzeźnica  is a village in Wadowice County, Lesser Poland Voivodeship, in southern Poland. It is the seat of the gmina (administrative district) called Gmina Brzeźnica.

The village has a population of 1,200.

References

Villages in Wadowice County